Frédéric Justin Collet (28 April 1870 – 1966) was a French pathologist and otolaryngologist. 

He studied medicine in Lyon, where he had as instructors Raphaël Lépine (1851–1919), and Antonin Poncet (1849–1913). In 1894 he obtained his doctorate, and in 1901 was appointed médecin des hôpitaux. Later he became a professor of general pathology in Lyon, being appointed professor of internal pathology in 1907, and a professor of otolaryngology in 1927.

In 1910 with André Chantemesse (1851–1919) and Antonin Poncet (1849–1913), he founded the Bibliothèque de la Tuberculose, which was a collection of monographs dedicated to tuberculosis.

Collet-Sicard syndrome 
In 1915 he described a disorder he called "glossolaryngoscapulopharyngeal hemiplegia", which was later to be named "Collet's syndrome". This disorder is caused by a lesion of cranial nerves IX, X, XI, and XII, resulting in paralysis of the vocal cords, palate, trapezius muscle and sternocleidomastoid muscle. It also results in anaesthesia of the larynx, pharynx and soft palate. This condition is sometimes referred to as  "Collet-Sicard syndrome", named in conjunction with Jean-Athanase Sicard, who provided a description of the disorder independent of Collet.

Selected writings 
 Atlas stéréoscopique d’anatomie du nez et du larynx (with Jean Garel), 1897.
 Les troubles auditifs dans les maladies nerveuses, 1897
 Précis de pathologie interne, 1899; 9th edition- 1926.
 L’odorat et ses troubles, 1904. 
 La tuberculose du larynx et des voies respiratoires supérieures, 1913
 Précis des maladies de l’appareil respiratoire, 1914
 Oto-laryngologie avec application à la neurologie, 1928

References

 Frédéric Justin Collet @ Who Named It

French pathologists
University of Lyon alumni
Academic staff of the University of Lyon
1870 births
1966 deaths
French otolaryngologists
Place of birth missing
Place of death missing
Date of death missing